The Guard is a Canadian drama television series portraying the life of the Canadian Coast Guard along the British Columbia Coast. Filming takes place in Squamish, British Columbia with Howe Sound standing in for the fictional Port Hallet and a real 47-foot Coast Guard lifeboat Cape St. James has been renamed Cape Pacific for the series.

The show primarily revolves around the four main characters: Miro Da Silva (Steve Bacic), Laura Nelson (Claudette Mink - Season 1; Sonya Salomaa - Seasons 2 and 3), Andrew Vanderlee (Jeremy Guilbaut), and Carly Greig (Zoie Palmer). There is also a strong supporting cast, including Gordon Michael Woolvett (as Barry Winter), who worked with Bacic previously on Andromeda, and Eve Harlow, who won a 2009 Leo Award for her role on the show.

The show focuses on both the professional and personal lives of the lead characters, confronting issues such as addiction, post traumatic stress disorder, and family problems.

It was picked up by Ion premiering March 13, 2010. By late April, it was put on hiatus on the basis that it "did not find a broad enough audience on the network", explained a spokesperson. It subsequently aired for a period on the ION Life digital channel.

Episodes

While there is agreement that 22 episodes of The Guard have been produced, the organization into seasons has provided some controversy. Originally, Halifax Film announced a first season consisting of 7 episodes. Halifax announced on October 9, 2008 that season 2 would consist of 15 episodes beginning on 29 October 2008. In the final press kit, it states, "The Guard returns with a new season of 15 one-hour episodes on October 29 in its new timeslot Wednesday at 10 PM on Global TV." However, in this same press kit (edited after the series was completed), Halifax Film opts to relabel the episodes for marketing purposes in other markets so that season 1 consists of 13 episodes, while season 2 consists of 9 episodes.

Many television viewers, however, regard the most appropriate organization to consist of three seasons. The first season consisting of 7 episodes was shown in the period 22 January 2008 to 4 March 2008. This was followed by a hiatus of 7.5 months where no new programs were shown. The second season consisted of 7 episodes in the period 29 October 2008 to 10 December 2008. Again, there was a hiatus, this time for over five months, until a third season, consisting of 8 episodes, was shown in the period 18 May 2009 to 6 July 2009. No further new episodes were shown after this date.

Season 1 (2008)

Season 2 (2008)

Season 3 (2009)

References

External links 

 
 GuardFans.com

2000s Canadian drama television series
2008 Canadian television series debuts
2009 Canadian television series endings
Global Television Network original programming
Television shows set in British Columbia
Television series by DHX Media